The 1904–05 Bucknell Bison men's basketball team represented Bucknell University during the 1904–05 college men's basketball season. The Bisons team captain of the 1904–05 season was George Cockill.

Schedule

|-

References

Bucknell Bison men's basketball seasons
Bucknell
Bucknell
Bucknell